Kamel Kohil (born 25 December 1971) is an Algerian long-distance runner. He competed in the men's marathon at the 2000 Summer Olympics.

References

External links
 

1971 births
Living people
Athletes (track and field) at the 2000 Summer Olympics
Algerian male long-distance runners
Algerian male marathon runners
Olympic athletes of Algeria
Place of birth missing (living people)
Mediterranean Games bronze medalists for Albania
Mediterranean Games medalists in athletics
Athletes (track and field) at the 1997 Mediterranean Games
21st-century Algerian people
20th-century Algerian people